John Trail (born 2 October 1943) is an Australian sprint canoeist who competed in the mid-1970s. He was eliminated in the semifinals of the K-4 1000 m event at the 1976 Summer Olympics in Montreal, Quebec, Canada.

References
Sports-Reference.com profile

1943 births
Australian male canoeists
Canoeists at the 1976 Summer Olympics
Living people
Olympic canoeists of Australia
20th-century Australian people